James Moriarty (born 7 June 2001) is an Australian road and track cyclist, who currently rides for UCI Continental team . He won a bronze medal in the team pursuit at the 2022 Commonwealth Games.

Major results

Track

2018
 3rd Madison (with Blake Quick), National Championships
2019
 2nd Omnium, National Championships
2021
 National Championships
2nd Individual pursuit
2nd Team pursuit
2022
 1st  Team pursuit, Oceanian Championships
 2nd Team pursuit, National Championships
 UCI Nations Cup, Milton
1st Team pursuit
3rd Individual pursuit
 3rd  Team pursuit, Commonwealth Games

Road
2019
 3rd Time trial, National Junior Road Championships

References

External links
 

2001 births
Living people
Australian male cyclists
Australian track cyclists
21st-century Australian people
Cyclists at the 2022 Commonwealth Games
Commonwealth Games bronze medallists for Australia
Commonwealth Games medallists in cycling
Medallists at the 2022 Commonwealth Games
Cyclists from Brisbane